Aleksandar Kolarov (born 10 November 1985) is a Serbian former professional footballer. He was named Serbian Player of the Year in 2011.

Kolarov began his career at Red Star Belgrade, but he did not break through and moved onto Čukarički in 2004. Two years later, he joined OFK Beograd before moving abroad for the first time by signing for Lazio in Serie A, where he won the Coppa Italia and Supercoppa Italiana in 2009. In 2010, he joined Manchester City, with which he won two Premier League titles, the FA Cup and the League Cup.

Kolarov made his senior international debut for Serbia in 2008 and earned 94 caps. Kolarov was a member of Serbia's squads for the 2008 Olympics, 2010 FIFA World Cup and the 2018 FIFA World Cup.

Club career
Kolarov's football career started in the Red Star Belgrade youth system. He later joined the youth system of Obilić.

Čukarički
In 2004, 18-year-old Kolarov moved across Belgrade to Čukarički, which played in the top-tier Serbia-Montenegro League. Signing a three-year contract, he finished the 2003–04 season in the club's youth setup and during the summer of 2004 was introduced to the first-team squad. Making 27 league appearances in his debut season, the youngster left a good impression but could not help the beleaguered team avoid relegation.

Kolarov started the 2005–06 campaign for Čukarički in the second-tier league competition, but during the winter break controversially transferred to top-tier league club OFK Beograd.

OFK Beograd
Kolarov joined OFK Beograd in February 2006 and finished out the season with them, scoring his first league goal.

Lazio
In the summer of 2007, OFK Beograd sold Kolarov to Italian side Lazio (the third placed team in previous season's Serie A standings) for a €925,000 transfer fee.

Kolarov's first goal for Lazio came at the Stadio Oreste Granillo in Reggio Calabria on 30 September 2007, as he hit a rocket from 38 metres to secure a draw against lowly Reggina. During his first season in Rome, the 21-year-old Serb also participated in the UEFA Champions League for the first time, making his debut on 24 October 2007 away at Werder Bremen in a 2–1 victory.

In his second season in Italy, Kolarov established himself as Lazio's first choice at left back, scoring a spectacular goal against Lecce at the Stadio Via del Mare. It got even better for the Serbian in the second Derby della Capitale of the season, against city rivals Roma. With Lazio 3–2 up, Kolarov received the ball in defence from goalkeeper Fernando Muslera and proceeded to run the length of the pitch virtually unopposed. Having run 85 metres, Kolarov then slotted the ball past a helpless Doni in the Roma goal. On 13 May 2009, Kolarov played in the 2009 Coppa Italia Final against Sampdoria. The match finished 1–1 after extra time, and Kolarov scored one of Lazio's penalties in the resultant penalty shoot-out, helping Lazio win the trophy and capping a great season for the Serbian.

Lazio and 2008–09 Serie A champions Inter Milan travelled to Beijing in August 2009 to play the 2009 Supercoppa Italiana. Kolarov picked up his second winner's medal, with Lazio defeating Inter 2–1. As the 2009–10 season drew to an end, Kolarov was instantly linked with a move away from Lazio, with Manchester City and Real Madrid supposedly interested.

Manchester City

On 24 July 2010, it was announced that Kolarov had signed for Manchester City for a reported £16 million transfer fee. On 14 August, Kolarov made his Premier League debut in the 0–0 draw against Tottenham Hotspur at White Hart Lane. On 18 January 2011, Kolarov scored his first goal for the club in a 4–2 victory over Leicester City in the FA Cup, while on 2 February 2011, Kolarov recorded his first Premier League goal from a free kick in a 2–2 draw against Birmingham City. He played the full 90 minutes as City won the 2011 FA Cup Final.

The summer 2011 arrival of Gaël Clichy to the club marginalized Kolarov's role in the squad and he saw his first team opportunities greatly reduced. On 14 September 2011, he scored an equaliser for City in the 1–1 draw against Napoli in their first 2011–12 Champions League group stage match. On 1 October 2011, he started and played the full 90 minutes in the left-back slot against Blackburn Rovers at Ewood Park in a 0–4 away victory in the Premier League. On 31 March 2012, he added another with a long-range swing which earned City a point against Sunderland at home, after coming back from 3–1 down. He ended that season with 12 league appearances, enough for a medal, as Manchester City won the 2011–12 Premier League title in dramatic circumstances on the last day of the season. On 18 September 2012, he scored a free kick in a 3–2 Champions League defeat at Real Madrid. He went on to score in the League Cup loss to Aston Villa, while in their match against Sunderland, he scored another free-kick just five minutes into the match.

Kolarov scored from the penalty spot in City's 3–2 comeback victory over Bayern Munich in the final match of their Champions League group stage on 10 December 2013, securing his side a spot in the knockout stages of the Champions League for the first time in club history. He scored his only league goal of the 2013–14 season on 1 January 2014, netting past goalkeeper Gerhard Tremmel as City defeated Swansea City by a score of 3–2. On 11 May, he won his second Premier League trophy with Manchester City after making 30 appearances in the league, and 44 in all competitions. In June 2014, Kolarov signed a new three-year deal with City, keeping him at the club until 2017.

Roma

On 22 July 2017, Roma confirmed they had signed Kolarov on a three-year deal for a fee of €5 million.

Kolarov scored on his debut for the club on 20 August, scoring the winning goal in a 1–0 win over Atalanta. On 18 October, in the UEFA Champions League, he scored in a 3–3 draw with Chelsea. Four days later, he scored the winning goal in a 1–0 win over Torino.

On 26 September, Kolarov scored his first goal of the 2018–19 season in a 4–0 win over Frosinone. On 29 September, he scored against his former club and city rivals Lazio in a 3–1 win, becoming just the second player in history to have scored for both clubs in a Rome derby.

Inter Milan 
On 8 September 2020, Kolarov joined Inter Milan on a reported one-year deal, with an option to extend for a further year, for a fee of €1.5 million.

Retirement 
On 19 June 2022, Kolarov announced his retirement from professional football.

International career

Kolarov was a part of the successful Serbia under-21 side which reached the final of the 2007 U-21 Championships held in the Netherlands. As a key member of that side, Kolarov was named in the UEFA Team of the tournament. In the semi-final clash with Belgium, he scored a free-kick from long range.

In June 2010, he was selected in Serbia's squad for the 2010 FIFA World Cup, where he appeared in group stage matches against Ghana and Germany.

Kolarov played a major roles in UEFA Euro 2012 qualifiers and friendlies. Kolarov was eventually rewarded for an impressive 2011 with the Serbian Footballer of the Year award.

On 11 September 2012, Kolarov scored his first goal for Serbia during a 6–1 win against Wales in a 2014 World Cup qualifier. On 7 June 2013, he scored from a free kick against Belgium in a 2014 World Cup qualifier. On 7 September 2014, he scored the equalizer in a 1–1 draw with France.

Having helped Serbia qualify for the 2018 FIFA World Cup, their first international tournament for eight years, he was also included in the final 23-man squad for that competition. Kolarov scored the only goal of their opening match against Costa Rica from a free kick. He captained Serbia in all three group stage matches.

Style of play
Although primarily a left-back, Kolarov could also operate as a centre-back and anywhere along the left flank and was known for his overlapping attacking runs on the wing, his powerful ball-striking ability with his left foot, and his accuracy from free kicks.

Career statistics

Club

International

Score and results list Serbia's goal tally first

Honours
Lazio
Coppa Italia: 2008–09
Supercoppa Italiana: 2009

Manchester City
Premier League: 2011–12, 2013–14
FA Cup: 2010–11; runner-up: 2012–13
Football League Cup: 2013–14, 2015–16
FA Community Shield: 2012

Inter Milan
Serie A: 2020–21
Supercoppa Italiana: 2021

Serbia U21
UEFA European Under-21 Championship runner-up: 2007

Individual
Serbian Player of the Year: 2011
Serie A Team of the Year: 2018–19
A.S. Roma Team of the Decade: 2010–2020

References

External links

1985 births
Living people
Footballers from Belgrade
Serbian footballers
Association football defenders
FK Čukarički players
OFK Beograd players
S.S. Lazio players
Manchester City F.C. players
A.S. Roma players
Inter Milan players
First League of Serbia and Montenegro players
Serbian SuperLiga players
Premier League players
Serie A players
FA Cup Final players
Serbia under-21 international footballers
Serbia international footballers
2010 FIFA World Cup players
2018 FIFA World Cup players
Olympic footballers of Serbia
Serbian expatriate footballers
Expatriate footballers in England
Expatriate footballers in Italy
Serbian expatriate sportspeople in England
Serbian expatriate sportspeople in Italy